Zoran Savic (born 13 August 1959) is a retired Serbian American soccer player who played at the forward position. He played professionally in the first Major Indoor Soccer League. He later played in the second and third American Soccer League then the American Professional Soccer League and the American Indoor Soccer Association. He is a professional coach and is currently an assistant coach at Sporting Kansas City of Major League Soccer.

Playing career
In 1980, Savic signed with the Buffalo Stallions of the Major Indoor Soccer League and played two seasons with the team. In 1981, he played outdoor soccer with the Cleveland Cobras. On June 18, 1982, he was signed with the Kansas City Comets of Major Indoor Soccer League and played two seasons with the team. In May 1983 he joined the Oklahoma City Slickers of the American Soccer League.

On July 31, 1987, Zoran signed with the Los Angeles Lazers. On October 19, 1989, the Milwaukee Wave traded Savic to the Memphis Storm team for money and the Wave's first and second-round picks in the 1990 Amateur Draft. He began the 1989–90 season with the team, but was later traded to the Atlanta Attack in exchange for Glenn Lurie on December 29, 1989. In 1991, he played for the Albany Capitals of the American Professional Soccer League.

Yearly Awards
 AISA Top Points Scorer 1985–86
 AISA All-Star Team 1985–86, 1986–87
 NPSL Coach of the Year 1994–95

References

External links
Chivas coach profile
MISL stats

1959 births
Living people
Albany Capitals players
Atlanta Attack players
American Professional Soccer League players
American Soccer League (1988–89) players
American Soccer League (1933–1983) players
Buffalo Stallions players
Cleveland Cobras players
Kansas City Attack players
Kansas City Comets (original MISL) players
Los Angeles Lazers players
Louisville Thunder players
Major Indoor Soccer League (2001–2008) coaches
Major Indoor Soccer League (1978–1992) players
Memphis Storm players
Milwaukee Wave players
Oklahoma City Slickers (ASL) players
Orlando Lions players
Tampa Bay Rowdies (1975–1993) players
Chivas USA non-playing staff
Sporting Kansas City non-playing staff
Association football forwards
Yugoslav footballers
People from Gornji Milanovac